Durham is a city in Washington County, Oregon, United States. Incorporated in 1966, the city is surrounded by Tigard and Tualatin and is adjacent to the Bridgeport Village shopping complex. The population was 1,351 at the 2010 census.

History
The city was named for Albert Alonzo Durham, founder of the nearby town of Lake Oswego. Durham operated a sawmill and a flour mill on Fanno Creek, which flows through the city, from 1866 until his death in 1898. The site, located along the Boones Ferry Road to Portland, was originally known as Durhams Mills. In 1908, the Oregon Electric Railway established a stop called Durham at the location. Residents of the city voted for incorporation in 1966 to protect the location from industrialization of its residential areas. Today, the community is primarily residential.

Geography
Part of the western boundary of the city is the Tualatin River, with Durham City Park also on the western edge of Durham.

Government
Durham's mayor is Gery Schirado and the city administrator is Linda Tate. Children in the community attend the schools of the Tigard-Tualatin School District. The city's police protection is provided under contract by the Tualatin Police Department, and fire protection is provided by Tualatin Valley Fire & Rescue. The city is part of the Tigard Water District for drinking water, while wastewater treatment is provided by Clean Water Services. Durham's annual budget is around $2.4 million.

Demographics

2010 census
As of the census of 2010, there were 1,351 people, 545 households, and 371 families living in the city. The racial makeup of the city was 83.8% White, 1.7% African American, 0.4% Native American, 1.3% Asian, 1.4% Pacific Islander, 8.2% from other races, and 3.2% from two or more races. Hispanic or Latino of any race were 13.8% of the population.

There were 545 households, of which 33.6% had children under the age of 18 living with them, 51.9% were married couples living together, 12.3% had a female householder with no husband present, 3.9% had a male householder with no wife present, and 31.9% were non-families. 24.2% of all households were made up of individuals, and 5.7% had someone living alone who was 65 years of age or older. The average household size was 2.48 and the average family size was 2.95.

The median age in the city was 38.1 years. 24.1% of residents were under the age of 18; 9.7% were between the ages of 18 and 24; 23.8% were from 25 to 44; 32% were from 45 to 64; and 10.3% were 65 years of age or older. The gender makeup of the city was 48.3% male and 51.7% female.

2000 census
As of the census of 2000, there were 1,382 people, 528 households, and 391 families living in the city. The population density was 3,144.3 people per square mile (1,212.7/km2). There were 552 housing units at an average density of 1,255.9 per square mile (484.4/km2). The racial makeup of the city was 89.29% White, 0.80% African American, 0.72% Native American, 1.66% Asian, 0.36% Pacific Islander, 3.18% from other races, and 3.98% from two or more races. Hispanic or Latino of any race were 7.81% of the population.

There were 528 households, out of which 43.2% had children under the age of 18 living with them, 56.8% were married couples living together, 14.4% had a female householder with no husband present, and 25.8% were non-families. 18.9% of all households were made up of individuals, and 3.2% had someone living alone who was 65 years of age or older. The average household size was 2.62 and the average family size was 3.01.

In the city, the population was spread out, with 30.9% under the age of 18, 6.5% from 18 to 24, 29.6% from 25 to 44, 27.1% from 45 to 64, and 5.9% who were 65 years of age or older. The median age was 34 years. For every 100 females, there were 94.1 males. For every 100 females age 18 and over, there were 87.3 males.

The median income for a household in the city was $51,806, and the median income for a family was $64,531. Males had a median income of $59,712 versus $33,750 for females. The per capita income for the city was $29,099. About 10.2% of families and 10.8% of the population were below the poverty line, including 14.7% of those under age 18 and 13.7% of those age 65 or over.

References

External links
 
 Entry for Durham in the Oregon Blue Book
 City of Durham, Oregon website

Cities in Oregon
Cities in Washington County, Oregon
Portland metropolitan area
1908 establishments in Oregon
Populated places established in 1908